Agroclavine belongs to the group of ergot alkaloids, such as ergotamine. Historically, the main use of agroclavine was to oxidize it to elymoclavine, which can then be used for ergot-based drug synthesis.

References

Ergot alkaloids